The Alexander von Humboldt Memorial to the right of the Humboldt University main building on Unter den Linden avenue in Berlin's Mitte district commemorates the Prussian polymath and natural scientist Alexander von Humboldt (1769–1859). Created in 1882 by Reinhold Begas in neo-baroque style, the marble statue is a masterpiece of the Berlin school of sculpture.

Gallery

References

Further reading

External links 

 Alexander von Humboldt Memorial – Berlin Monument Authority (in German)

1883 establishments in Germany
1883 sculptures
Alexander von Humboldt
Humboldt University of Berlin
Monuments and memorials in Berlin
Outdoor sculptures in Berlin
Sculptures of men in Germany
Statues in Berlin
Statues in Germany
Works by German people